Northern Lights was a music program on the Radio One and Radio 2 networks of the Canadian Broadcasting Corporation, hosted by Andrea Ratuski of CBC Winnipeg.  Airing weeknights at 11:00 p.m. or 11:30 p.m. Newfoundland on Radio One and at 4:00 a.m. or 4:40 a.m. Newfoundland on Radio Two, the program featured two hours of essentially continuous classical music recordings.

In the CBC's programming changes of 2007, Northern Lights was discontinued, and was replaced by Nightstream on Radio Two.

External links
 Northern Lights

CBC Radio One programs
CBC Music programs
Canadian classical music radio programs